Risalah is the Arabic word for treatise, but among the Shia, the term is used as shorthand for a Resalah Amaliyah (risalah-yi'amaliyyah) or treatise on practical law. These treatises are also known as collections of juridical edicts or clarifications of questions. They are usually written by a mujtahid as part of the process of becoming a Marja'-e-Taqlid, i.e. a Grand Ayatollah. These books contain the cleric's practical rulings on the application of Islam to daily life.  They are arranged according to topics such as ritual purity, worship, social issues, business, and political affairs.  In considering each application they outline the principles and texts used to reach a specific ruling. They are used by a Marja's followers to conform their behaviour to Islam.

All resalahs begin with an explicit disclaimer stating that no proof shall be given for any of the five articles of faith in the Roots of Religion (Usul al-dín).

See also
Ayatollah
Taqleed
Usooli

Notes and references

Shia Islam